William Byllyngtre was the member of the Parliament of England for Marlborough for the parliament of May 1413.

References 

Members of Parliament for Marlborough
Year of birth unknown
Year of death unknown
English MPs May 1413